Richard Thatcher (March 23, 1846 – November 28, 1909) was an American educator, and Civil War veteran. He was a school administrator in Kansas and Oklahoma, hotel operator and the first President of Territorial Normal School, now the University of Central Oklahoma.

Early life
Richard Thatcher was born on March 23, 1846 in Alton, Illinois. His father, John Wesley Thatcher was a reverend. At the age of 15 he left to join the Union Army as a member of the 111th Illinois Volunteer Infantry Regiment. He was captured on July 22, 1864, and sent to the notorious Andersonville Prison, where he began to have chronic respiratory issues. He was later released during a prisoner exchange. After the war he attended McKendree College in Lebanon, Illinois and graduated in 1878.

Academic career

Thatcher would be a superintendent in Kansas, before moving to Edmond, Oklahoma in 1890. He operated the Central Hotel until 1891 when he became the first president of Territorial Normal School. He would hold that post until 1893. He would become principal of Edmond Schools from 1894-1895. UCO would later name Thatcher Hall in his honor.

Personal life

Thatcher married Melissa D. DeFord a native of Ashley, Illinois. They had five children, four daughters of whom survived infancy, Edna, Mae, Blanche, and Ethel.

Thatcher was also a Freemason, reaching the 33rd degree, and was the second master of the Edmond Lodge.

Death

Thatcher died on November 28, 1909 in Edmond, Oklahoma from complications from tuberculosis. He was 63 years old.

References

1846 births
1909 deaths
People from Alton, Illinois
McKendree University alumni
Union Army soldiers
American Civil War prisoners of war
Presidents of the University of Central Oklahoma
University of Central Oklahoma faculty
American Freemasons
20th-century deaths from tuberculosis
Tuberculosis deaths in Oklahoma